Ilar (the Welsh, and Croatian, form of the masculine given name Hilary) may refer to:

 Saint Ilar, a 6th-century Welsh saint
 Hilary of Poitiers (4th century), bishop of Poitiers in France, in Welsh sources
 Saint Hilarion (4th century), an Egyptian monk, in Croatian sources
 Ilar (hundred), a hundred of Cardiganshire named for Llanilar
 Llanilar ("St Ilar's")
 International League of Associations of Rheumatology (ILAR)
 Institute for Laboratory Animal Research

See also
 Hilary (name)
 Eleri (disambiguation), another Welsh form of this name
 Elar (disambiguation)